Timimoun is a town and commune, and capital of Timimoun District, in Adrar Province, south-central Algeria. According to the 2008 census it has a population of 33,060, up from 28,595 in 1998, with an annual growth rate of 1.5%.

Timimoun is known for the red ochre color of its buildings.

Geography

It is located on the south-eastern side of an oasis which supports the town's population. A sebkha (salt lake) lies further to the northwest, while the plateau of Tademaït rises to the southeast.

Climate

Timimoun has a hot desert climate (Köppen climate classification BWh), with extremely hot summers and warm winters, with minimal rainfall throughout the year. The annual mean temperature almost reaches 25 °C (77 °F).

<div style="width:82%;">

Transportation

Timimoun lies on the N51 national highway, a road which runs roughly west to east from the N6 (connecting to Béchar in the north and Adrar in the south) to the N1 (connecting from Ghardaïa in the north to In Salah and Tamanrasset in the south). Regional roads also lead south to Aougrout and Deldoul communes, and north to Tinerkouk, Ksar Kaddour and Ouled Said.

Education

7.0% of the population has a tertiary education, and another 19.3% has completed secondary education. The overall literacy rate is 79.6%, and is 87.5% among males and 71.8% among females.

Carpets

Localities

As of 1984, the commune was composed of 32 localities:

Timimoun
Tala
Tinoumeur
Bouyahia
Ouled Nouh
Zaouiet Sidi Hadj Belkacem
Beni Melhal
Beni Mellouk
Ouadjda
Taoursit
Massahel
Tsmana
Azekkour
Tarouaïa
Alamellal
Aghiat
Massine
El Barka
Ouamemi
Amakbour
Amezgar
Kef Elkasbah
Kef Elksar
Béni Guentour Lahmer
Samjane
Taounza
Hiha
Yakou
El Kort
Tilaghmine
Timazlane
Béni Aïssi Sidi Mansour Tganet

References 

Neighbouring towns and cities

Communes of Adrar Province